Charles George (August 10, 1886 – December 30, 1946) was an American equestrian. He competed in two events at the 1928 Summer Olympics.

References

1886 births
1946 deaths
American male equestrians
Olympic equestrians of the United States
Equestrians at the 1928 Summer Olympics
People from San Angelo, Texas